Pegasus Hotel may refer to:

Jamaica Pegasus Hotel, a hotel in Kingston, Jamaica